Pojbuky is a municipality and village in Tábor District in the South Bohemian Region of the Czech Republic. It has about 100 inhabitants.

Administrative parts
Villages of Blatnice, Dolní Světlá and Zadní Lomná are administrative parts of Pojbuky.

References

Villages in Tábor District